The Eagle Eye was a newspaper for African Americans published by Arrington High in Jackson, Mississippi.

References

Defunct African-American newspapers
Defunct newspapers published in Mississippi